Douglas Family Gold is a reality television series for Oxygen. The show, which follows the life of 2012 Olympic all-around gymnastics champion Gabby Douglas and her family, premiered on May 25, 2016.

Development 
In March 2015, plans were released about the idea of the show; production and release dates were unclear though. However, on March 8, 2016 – following her win at the 2016 AT&T American Cup – it was revealed the show was set to broadcast on Wednesday, May 25, 2016, at 10/9c.

Rod Aissa, Executive Vice President of Programming at Oxygen, described the show's premise as “The series provides an inside look at an inspirational family who doesn’t let any obstacles stand in their way, and when dreams are on the line ‘Team Douglas’ comes together and outshines the competition".

Cast 
 Gabby Douglas
 Natalie Hawkins
 Arielle Hawkins
 Joyelle Douglas
 Johnathan Douglas
 Carolyn Ford

Episodes

References 

2010s American reality television series
2016 American television series debuts
2016 American television series endings
English-language television shows
Oxygen (TV channel) original programming
Television series by Lionsgate Television